Tosagua Canton is a canton of Ecuador, located in the Manabí Province.  Its capital is the town of Tosagua.  Its population at the 2001 census was 33,922.

Demographics
Ethnic groups as of the Ecuadorian census of 2010:
Mestizo  59.6%
Montubio  31.5%
Afro-Ecuadorian  5.5%
White  3.3%
Indigenous  0.1%
Other  0.1%

References

 www.inec.gov.ec pdf (Spanish)

Cantons of Manabí Province